The Archbishop of Glasgow is an archiepiscopal title that takes its name after the city of Glasgow in Scotland. The position and title were abolished by the Church of Scotland in 1689; and, in the Scottish Episcopal Church, it is now part of the Episcopal bishopric of Glasgow and Galloway. In the Roman Catholic Church, the title was restored by Pope Leo XIII in 1878.

The present Roman Catholic Archbishop is William Nolan, who was installed on 26 February 2022.

History
The Diocese of Glasgow originates in the period of the reign of David I, Prince of the Cumbrians, but the earliest attested bishops come from the 11th century, appointees of the Archbishop of York. The episcopal seat was located at Glasgow Cathedral. In 1492, the diocese was elevated to an archdiocese by Pope Innocent VIII. After the Scottish church broke its links with Rome in 1560, the archbishopric continued under the independent Scottish church until 1689 when Episcopacy in the established Church of Scotland was finally abolished in favour of Presbyterianism, requiring bishopric continuity to occur in the disestablished Scottish Episcopal Church.

In the following centuries Roman Catholicism slowly began a process of re-introduction, culminating in 1829 with legalisation through the Catholic Emancipation Act. A new papally-appointed archbishopric in the Roman Catholic Church was introduced when the Vicariate Apostolic of the Western District was elevated to archdiocese status on 4 March 1878 on the restoration of the Scottish hierarchy, and then to metropolitan archdiocese status on 25 May 1947.

Pre-Reformation office holders

Bishops of Glasgow

Archbishops of Glasgow

Post-Reformation office holders

Church of Scotland succession
{| class="wikitable" style="width:95%;" border="1" cellpadding="2"
|- align=left
! width="20%"|Tenure
! width="30%"|Incumbent
! width="45%"|Notes
|- valign=top bgcolor="#ffffec"
|1571–1572||(John Porterfield)||
|- valign=top bgcolor="#ffffec"
|1573–1581||James Boyd of Trochrig||
|- valign=top bgcolor="#ffffec"
|1581–1585||Robert Montgomerie||
|- valign=top bgcolor="#ffffec"
|1585–1587||William Erskine||
|- valign=top bgcolor="#ffffec"
|1585–1587||Walter Stewart||
|- valign=top bgcolor="#ffffec"
|1598–1603||James Beaton ||Reinstated to title, style, dignity and benefices of the Archbishopric by King James VI, but "being not of our religion" not to the actual exercise of the office.
|- valign=top bgcolor="#ffffec"
|1603–1615||John Spottiswoode||
|- valign=top bgcolor="#ffffec"
|1615–1632||James Law||
|- valign=top bgcolor="#ffffec"
|1632–1638||Patrick Lindsay||
|- valign=top bgcolor="#ffffec"
|1638–1661||colspan=2|See temporally abolished.
|- valign=top bgcolor="#ffffec"
|1661–1664||Andrew Fairfoul||First bishop of the Restoration Episcopate.
|- valign=top bgcolor="#ffffec"
|1664–1669||Alexander Burnet||
|- valign=top bgcolor="#ffffec"
|1671–1674||Robert Leighton||
|- valign=top bgcolor="#ffffec"
|1674–1679||Alexander Burnet (again)||
|- valign=top bgcolor="#ffffec"
|1679–1684||Arthur Rose||
|- valign=top bgcolor="#ffffec"
|1684–1687||Alexander Cairncross||
|- valign=top bgcolor="#ffffec"
|1687–1689||John Paterson||Deprived of the temporalities in 1689 when episcopacy was permanently abolished in the Church of Scotland following the Glorious Revolution.
|-valign=top bgcolor="#ffffec"
|align=center colspan="3"| Source(s):
|}

Scottish Episcopal Church succession

Restored Roman Catholic bishopric
The archdiocese covers an area of 1,165 km2. The Metropolitan See is in the City of Glasgow where the seat is located at the Cathedral Church of Saint Andrew.

(Any dates appearing in italics indicate de facto  continuation of office.  The start date of tenure below is the date of appointment or succession. Where known, the date of installation and ordination as bishop are listed in the notes together with the post held prior to appointment.)

See also

Catholicism in Scotland
Presbyterianism
Church of Scotland
Presbytery of Glasgow (Church of Scotland)
Bishops in the Church of Scotland
Bishop's Castle, Glasgow

References

Bibliography

 Dowden, John, The Bishops of Scotland, ed. J. Maitland Thomson, (Glasgow, 1912)
 Keith, Robert, An Historical Catalogue of the Scottish Bishops: Down to the Year 1688, (London, 1824)
 Lawrie, Sir Archibald, Early Scottish Charters Prior to A.D. 1153, (Glasgow, 1905)
 Watt, D. E. R. & Murray, A. L., editors, Fasti Ecclesiae Scoticanae Medii Aevi Ad Annum 1638'', revised edition, Scottish Record Society, Edinburgh, 2003, p. 187–196. 

Bishop of Glasgow
Guardians of Scotland
Glasgow
Christianity in Glasgow

Glasgow
Glasgow-related lists
11th-century establishments in Scotland
1689 disestablishments in Scotland
1878 establishments in Scotland
Glasgow Cathedral